This is a description of Neolithic sites in Kosovo. The warm, humid climate of the Holocene which came soon after the ice melting of the last glacial period brought changes in nature which were reflected in humans, flora and fauna. This climatic stabilization influenced human life and activities; human society is characterized by changes in community organization and the establishment of permanent settlements in dry places, near riverbanks and on fertile plateaus.

History
Neolithic man used stone for weapons, tools and building. The cultural characteristics of the Neolithic are determined by the archaeological documentation. Major changes occurred during the period, including a shift from hunting and gathering to agriculture and settlement. Animals were domesticated and pottery produced. Humans evolved from nomadic to semi-nomadic life; crop cultivation was the main economic activity, and the land was worked with stone, bone, horn and wooden tools. Women made clothing, pottery, cared for children, prepared food and domesticated small animals. Most anthropomorphic figurines represent female bodies.

The Neolithic economy was based on agriculture, the manufacture of tools, weapons and pottery, domesticating and breeding animal, hunting and fishing. Therefore, settlements were developed near natural resources. Most Neolithic sites in Kosovo feature dwellings built from materials found near the settlements: huts with wooden frames and sticks, coated with soil and mixed with oat chaff, with roofs made from twisted cane and rye chaff. Although archaeologists and academics differ about the exact dates of the Neolithic in the Balkans, it is generally agreed that the period extended from 6500 to 3500 BC. Cave and rock art confirm the use of caves as temporary shelters and places of worship. The primary cult was that of the mother goddess, and Neolithic society was matriarchal.

Settlements

Vlashnjë
The site contains evidence from a number of periods, from the early Starčevo and Vinča cultures through the Copper, Bronze and Iron Ages to the Hellenistic, Late Antiquity and the Early Middle Ages. Materials found at the site include clay pottery and vessel fragments, stone and bone tools, decorative and utilitarian artifacts and coins. Pottery fragments painted with geometric lines, a Starčevo flint knife, and anthropomorphic and zoomorphic figurines from the sixth millennium BC have been unearthed. A decorated baked-clay pot typical of the Vinča culture (third millennium BC), Bronze Age baked-clay table vessels and a 3.72-gram coin dating to 55 BC have also been found.

Runik
This site is in the village of Runik in the municipality of Skenderaj. The site, one of the most prominent early Neolithic sites in Kosovo to date, contains artifacts from the Starcevo culture. It was excavated from 1966 to 1968 and again in 1984, and research was conducted in about 35 private parcels in the Dardania neighborhood of Runik. Starcevo and Vinca pottery fragments dating to 6500-3500 BC have been found here. A  magnetic survey was conducted at the site in March 2010, and the remains of huts reinforced with wooden joists have been found. Monochrome pottery decorated with red gloss, Cardium pottery, barbotine earthenware and ceramic pottery painted with linear and geometric designs have been found, along with anthropomorphic figurines and cult tables (small altars). Ornamental artifacts include a spiral baked-clay vase tinted with ocher, painted in dark colors and decorated as the palm of a hand. A significant find is a baked-clay ocarina  in length, known as the Runik Ocarina, the oldest musical instrument found in Kosovo to date.

References

Bibliography
 Nicholas Marquez Grant, Linda Fibiger. "Kosovo". The Routledge Handbook of Archaeological Human Remains and Legislation, Taylor & Francis, 2011, 

 Luan Përzhita, Kemajl Luci, Gëzim Hoxha, Adem Bunguri, Fatmir Peja, Tomor Kastrati. Harta Arkeologjike e Kosovës vëllimi 1/ Archaeological Map of Kosovo vol.1 Akademia e Shkencave dhe e Arteve e Kosovës, Prishtinë 2006, 
 Cultural Heritage Without Borders. "An Archaeological Map of the Historic Zone of Prizren", CHwB Kosovo office, Report Series No.2/2006.
 Gail Warrander, Verena Knaus. Kosovo 2nd ed. Bradt Travel Guides, 2011, 
 Philip L. Kohl, Clare Fawcett, Nationalism, Politics and the Practice of Archaeology, Cambridge University Press, 1995,

External links
Kosovo's Lost City Rises From Earthy Tomb

Archaeological sites in Kosovo